California Responder is a Responder-class oil-skimming vessel registered in Norfolk, Virginia, USA, and based in Port Hueneme, California. California Responder and her sister ship, Pacific Responder, operated off the coast of Louisiana in the Gulf of Mexico during the Deepwater Horizon oil spill. The vessels sailed to the gulf from their home ports in California to assist in the containment efforts.

References

External links
 California Responder current position at VesselTracker

Deepwater Horizon oil spill
Service vessels of the United States
1992 ships